The Area C mine is an iron ore mine located in the Pilbara region of Western Australia, 92 kilometres west-north-west of Newman.

The mine is majority-owned (85 percent) and operated by BHP, and is one of seven iron ore mines the company operates in the Pilbara. The company also operates two port facilities at Port Hedland, Nelson Point and Finucane Island, and over 1,000 kilometres of rail in the Pilbara. The Area C mine is part of the Mount Goldsworthy joint venture, together with the Yarrie and Nimingarra mine, with the latter two being in care and maintenance since 2014 and 2007 respectively.

BHP is the second-largest iron ore mining company in the Pilbara, behind Rio Tinto and ahead of the Fortescue Metals Group. As of 2010, BHP employs 8,000 people in its Pilbara operations.

Overview

The Area C mine was officially opened on 30 October 2003 by Premier Geoff Gallop, but ore was already being railed from the mine to the port since 16 August. However, bulk samples of the ore had been mined and sent to customers since late 2001. The mine was initially scheduled to produce 15 million tonnes of iron ore annually.

Ore from the BHP mines is transported by rail to Port Hedland through two independent railways. The Mount Newman railway carries ore from Mount Whaleback, Orebodies 18, 23, 25 and 29, Jimblebar, Yandi and Area C. The Yarrie mine is serviced by the separate, shorter Goldsworthy railway.

Ore from the Mount Whaleback and the other Newman mines, as well as the Yandi mine is transported to the port at Nelson Point, while ore from Area C and Yarrie goes to Finucane Island. Ore is transported through a 1.16 kilometre long tunnel from Nelson Point to the port at Finucane Island. The average loading time for a ship is 30 hours, and 800 ships are loaded annually at Port Hedland.

Mining operations within BHP throughout the Pilbara were briefly suspended in September 2008 to focus on safety after two fatalities at the Yandi mine within 10 days of each other. Following this, mining has resumed.

References

External links 
 MINEDEX website: Mining Area C Database of the Department of Mines, Industry Regulation and Safety

Iron ore mines in Western Australia
Surface mines in Australia
Shire of East Pilbara
BHP
Itochu
2003 establishments in Australia